Brandon Mashinter (born September 20, 1988) is a Canadian professional ice hockey left wing. He is currently a free agent.

Playing career
In 2004, Mashinter was drafted in the 6th round of the Ontario Hockey League, 116th overall by the Sarnia Sting. He started 2004-05, his first year junior hockey with the Thornhill Thunderbirds of the Ontario Provincial Junior A Hockey League before moving up to join the Sting to finish off the season. Before the 2007-08 season Mashinter was traded to the Kitchener Rangers, the team selected to host the 2008 Memorial Cup. Mashinter won the 2008 OHL championship with the Rangers and scored the team's lone goal in their Memorial Cup final loss to the Spokane Chiefs. 

Undrafted, Mashinter signed as a free agent with the San Jose Sharks on March 3, 2009. He played in his first career NHL game on December 29, 2010 at the Xcel Energy Center in Saint Paul, Minnesota against the Minnesota Wild. He was traded to the New York Rangers on January 16, 2013, in exchange for Tommy Grant and a conditional 7th round draft pick in the 2014 NHL Entry Draft.

On December 6, 2013, the Rangers traded Mashinter to the Chicago Blackhawks for Kyle Beach. On December 13, 2015, Mashinter scored his first NHL goal in a 4-0 win against the Vancouver Canucks. During his tenure in Chicago, Mashinter primarily played with the team's AHL affiliate Rockford IceHogs. Mashinter appeared in a total of 41 games for the Blackhawks, recording 5 points. Mashinter also skated in two games during the 2016 Stanley Cup playoffs.

On September 11, 2017, Mashinter re-joined the Sharks as a free agent, agreeing to a one-year, two-way contract.

As a free agent into the 2018–19 season, on November 12, 2018, it was announced that Mashinter would join the Rapid City Rush of the ECHL. He registered 5 points in 5 games before opting to pursue a European career, agreeing to a contract for the remainder of the year with German outfit, ERC Ingolstadt of the DEL, on December 5, 2018.

Career statistics

References

External links

1988 births
Living people
Ice hockey people from Ontario
Canadian ice hockey left wingers
Undrafted National Hockey League players
Canadian expatriate ice hockey players in Germany
Sarnia Sting players
Kitchener Rangers players
Belleville Bulls players
Worcester Sharks players
San Jose Sharks players
Connecticut Whale (AHL) players
New York Rangers players
Hartford Wolf Pack players
Rockford IceHogs (AHL) players
Chicago Blackhawks players
San Jose Barracuda players
Rapid City Rush players
ERC Ingolstadt players
HK Poprad players
Canadian expatriate ice hockey players in the United States
Canadian expatriate ice hockey players in Slovakia